Daniel Kenedy Pimentel Mateus dos Santos (born 18 February 1974), known as Kenedy, is a Portuguese retired footballer. A midfielder or defender, he played on the left side of the pitch.

He appeared in 198 Primeira Liga matches over 11 seasons (13 goals), mainly in representation of Benfica and Estrela da Amadora. He also competed professionally in France, Spain, Cyprus and Greece.

In 2015, Kenedy began working as a manager.

Club career
Kenedy was born in Bissau, Portuguese Guinea. During his extensive career, he represented in his country S.L. Benfica – making his Primeira Liga debut at only 19 – FC Porto, C.F. Estrela da Amadora, C.S. Marítimo, S.C. Braga (January to December 2004) and Académica de Coimbra.

In 1996, Kenedy had his first abroad stint, with Paris Saint-Germain F.C. in France, starting regularly for the capital club as it finished second in Ligue 1. Subsequently, he represented Albacete Balompié – only three matches for the Spanish second division side – APOEL FC, Ergotelis FC, Kallithea FC, Aias Salamina F.C. and Peramaikos FC.

In Greece, Kenedy managed to appear in all three major levels of football. Overall, he played professional football in five countries.

On 17 March 2015, Kenedy was handed his first managerial post at C.D. Pinhalnovense, eventually helping avoid relegation from the third division. He was hired by second level strugglers Leixões S.C. on 2 November 2016, taking the team to the quarter-finals of the Taça de Portugal where they were eliminated by his former club Benfica after a 2–6 away loss. He resigned in August 2017, after only three games of the new season.

International career
Kenedy represented Portugal at the 1996 Summer Olympics, helping the nation finish fourth in Atlanta, Georgia. He was surprisingly called up to the 2002 FIFA World Cup squad while still uncapped on the senior level, after injuries ruled Simão Sabrosa and Luís Boa Morte out of António Oliveira's selection. However, he was dismissed from the team prior to the start of the tournament after testing positive for the banned diuretic furosemide that was in his slimming pills, and was replaced by Hugo Viana.

Personal life
Kenedy was named after American president John F. Kennedy (note the difference in spelling).

Career statistics

Club

Honours
Benfica
Primeira Liga: 1993–94
Taça de Portugal: 1992–93, 1995–96

Porto
Primeira Liga: 1997–98
Taça de Portugal: 1997–98

APOEL
Cypriot Cup: 2005–06

See also
List of doping cases in sport

References

External links

1974 births
Living people
Sportspeople from Bissau
Bissau-Guinean emigrants to Portugal
Portuguese footballers
Association football defenders
Association football midfielders
Primeira Liga players
S.L. Benfica footballers
FC Porto players
C.F. Estrela da Amadora players
C.S. Marítimo players
S.C. Braga players
Associação Académica de Coimbra – O.A.F. players
Ligue 1 players
Paris Saint-Germain F.C. players
Segunda División players
Albacete Balompié players
Cypriot First Division players
APOEL FC players
Super League Greece players
Football League (Greece) players
Ergotelis F.C. players
Kallithea F.C. players
Portugal youth international footballers
Portugal under-21 international footballers
Olympic footballers of Portugal
Footballers at the 1996 Summer Olympics
Portuguese expatriate footballers
Expatriate footballers in France
Expatriate footballers in Spain
Expatriate footballers in Cyprus
Expatriate footballers in Greece
Portuguese expatriate sportspeople in France
Portuguese expatriate sportspeople in Spain
Portuguese expatriate sportspeople in Cyprus
Portuguese expatriate sportspeople in Greece
Doping cases in association football
Portuguese sportspeople in doping cases
Portuguese football managers
Liga Portugal 2 managers
C.D. Pinhalnovense managers
S.R. Almancilense managers
Leixões S.C. managers